

Events

Events at the 2003 Pan American Games
2003
Pan American Games